The 1996 William & Mary Tribe football team represented the College of William & Mary as member of the Mid-Atlantic Division of the Yankee Conference during the 1996 NCAA Division I-AA football season. Led by Jimmye Laycock in his 17th year as head coach, William & Mary finished the season with an overall record of 10–3 and a mark of 7–1 in conference play, winning the Yankee Conference and Mid-Atlantic Division titles. They were ranked No. 5 in the final Sports Network poll.

Schedule

References

William and Mary
William & Mary Tribe football seasons
Yankee Conference football champion seasons
William and Mary Indians football